Gleb Vyacheslavovich Shevchenko or Hleb Vyachaslavavich Shawchenka (born 17 February 1999) is a Belarusian professional footballer who plays for Shakhtyor Soligorsk.

International career
He made his debut for Belarus national football team on 2 June 2021 in a friendly against Azerbaijan.

Honours
Shakhtyor Soligorsk
Belarusian Premier League: 2021, 2022
Belarusian Super Cup winner: 2021, 2023

References

External links 
 
 Profile at Slavia Mozyr website
 

1999 births
Living people
Belarusian footballers
Belarus youth international footballers
Belarus under-21 international footballers
Belarus international footballers
Association football midfielders
FC Slavia Mozyr players
FC Shakhtyor Soligorsk players